Amaravathi bus station is a bus station located in Amaravathi town of the Indian state of Andhra Pradesh. It is owned by Andhra Pradesh State Road Transport Corporation. This is one of the major bus stations in the district with buses available to places like Guntur, Vijayawada, Hyderabad, Mangalagiri, Sattenapalle, Krosuru and Tirupati etc.

References

Transport in Amaravati
Bus stations in Andhra Pradesh
Buildings and structures in Guntur district
Transport in Guntur district